The C.I.P. is an electronic duo band formed in late 2013 in Italy.
The group consists of Michele Scheveger (lead vocals and additional synthesizer) and Simone Cavalli (synthesizer and samplers).

History

Beginnings 

The C.I.P. was formed in Rome (Italy), in September 2013. After Michele graduated from university and Simone finished school, the two got to know each other and clicked instantly, playing for hours in Simone's garage, exchanging lyrics and co-writing songs—one of which became "The Pretender" and another "We'll Set The World On Fire". The duo began to practice together in studios, spending hours together writing music, attending electronic shows, and playing randomly at house parties. The duo first operated under a variety of names until they registered the band "The C.I.P". —a combination of original songs with the '80s and 90's attitude — was first recorded in a local studio in Tuscany in the summer of 2013, after more than one year of intense productions. The songs at that time were mainly gloomy, darker, and colder, as has been said by friends. "The local scene has nothing to offer," said Mike (Michele's nickname at present), but the band's popularity grew as did international pop electro concurrently in the mainstream.

Daydream and We'll Set The World On Fire 

The band's first performance was at a local festival for Halloween, and soon the duo graduated to Rome's major scene. That's when they met Antonio Filippelli, band's producer at present and big name in the indy Italian scene, having played for Vanilla Sky and having experienced a big variety of productions in his long career.
The two started collaborating with him in Rome and after spending more than five months in the studio with his supervision, their debut album "Daydream" went out in every digital store in June 2014 for Volcan Records and hit the1° position on theiTunes electro chart in Italy and the52° on the iTunes general chart.

The videoclip of the first single called “We’ll Set The World On Fire” was first launched by Rockit as an exclusive preview on the 23d of June and scored more than 30.000views reaching the 50.000 After being uploaded on Volcan's channel.
The idea behind the video was creating a dreamy vibrant atmosphere where three beautiful models would play the role of "desperate housewives", super sexy and all dressed up in bright 80's clothes.
The song has been popular during the summer and has been played by major Fm radios across the state.

Collaboration with MTV 

The C.I.P was nominated “artist of the week” by MTVNew Generation (MTV Italy)on the 30th of June and after less than one month The C.I.P was invited to perform at the MTV Digital Days(Torino) on the 13th of September 2014. Michele was in Australia at that time, collaborating with local promoters and agencies in Sydney, he jumped on a plane and in less than five days the band was ready to share the stage with artists likePlanet Funk, The Bloody Beetroots, Groove Armada, Todd Terje, Congorock.
During the event the band won the Best New Generation Electro MTV Music Award and was nominated “artist of the month” by MTV. The videoclip of their first single “We’ll Set The World On Fire” has been on heavy rotation from September the 21st to October the 20th on MTV MUSIC (Italy) and right after that The C.I.P appeared on Rolling Stone Magazine (Italy)

Discography

Members 

 Michele Scheveger - lead vocals
 Simone Cavalli - synthesizer and samplers

References

External links 
 Official Website

Italian pop music groups
Musical groups established in 2013
Synthpop groups
Italian musical duos
2013 establishments in Italy
Musical groups from Rome